Richard Paul Scott (born 29 September 1974) is an English professional footballer who made more than 200 appearances in the Football League playing for Birmingham City, Shrewsbury Town and Peterborough United. He played as a defender or midfielder.

Career
Scott joined Birmingham City as a YTS trainee in 1991, and turned professional in May 1993. He made his debut in the Second Division (third tier) on 6 April 1993 in a 1–1 draw at home to Derby County. He played six league games during the 1993–94 season, five the season after, plus seven in cup competitions, but was released in March 1995 and joined Shrewsbury Town. He spent three full seasons with the club, playing 105 league games in Divisions Two and Three, then signed for Peterborough United. In the 1999–2000 season, he helped the club to promotion from the Third Division via the play-offs. At the end of the next season, Scott rejected the offer of a new contract and left the club on a free transfer under the Bosman ruling. After 18 months in non-league football with Telford United and Stevenage Borough, Scott rejoined Peterborough for another 18 months before returning to non-league football for good. He spent a second spell at Stevenage, then played for Cambridge City, Moor Green (initially on loan), Bromsgrove Rovers, Corby Town, Rugby Town, where he acted as player-assistant manager, and Spalding United.

Scott was appointed player-manager of Spalding United in November 2009.

Scott is a UEFA B-licensed coach; in 2009, he was running a soccer school for children.

References

External links

1974 births
Living people
Sportspeople from Dudley
English footballers
Association football defenders
Birmingham City F.C. players
Shrewsbury Town F.C. players
Peterborough United F.C. players
Telford United F.C. players
Stevenage F.C. players
Cambridge City F.C. players
Moor Green F.C. players
Bromsgrove Rovers F.C. players
Corby Town F.C. players
Rugby Town F.C. players
Spalding United F.C. players
English Football League players
National League (English football) players
Southern Football League players
English football managers